Sandro Tau (born 30 April 1997) is a Tahitian footballer who plays as a midfielder for Tahitian club AS Pirae and the Tahiti national team.

Club career
Tau started his career in the youth of AS Tiare Tahiti. In 2015 he moved to the first team and made his debut. In 2017 he moved to Tahitian powerhouse AS Pirae.

International career
In 2018 Tau was called up by Naea Bennett for the Tahiti national football team to play two friendly games against New Caledonia. He made his debut on March 21, 2017 in a 0-0 draw against New Caledonia when he enter the field in the 70th minute of play, replacing Yohann Tihoni.

References

French Polynesian footballers
Association football defenders
Tahiti international footballers
Living people
1997 births